Geophis dugesii, also known as Dugès's earth snake, is a snake of the colubrid family. It is endemic to Mexico.

References

Geophis
Snakes of North America
Endemic reptiles of Mexico
Taxa named by Marie Firmin Bocourt
Reptiles described in 1883